Old Pilanji Village is about 600 years old. It lost its rural identity by the British in 1911 when Delhi was made the seat of Governance.

References

Villages_in_South_East_District_Delhi